Lubei Subdistrict is a subdistrict of Luqiao District, Taizhou, Zhejiang, People's Republic of China, with its government office located north of China National Highway 104. , it has 3 residential communities (社区) and 21 villages under its administration.

See also 
 List of township-level divisions of Zhejiang

References 

Township-level divisions of Zhejiang